Vardinogiannis is a Greek surname. Notable people with the surname include:
Giannis Vardinogiannis (born 1962), Greek  entrepreneur
Vardis Vardinogiannis (born 1931), Greek oil and shipping tycoon
Yiorgos Vardinogiannis (born 1936), Greek shipping magnate
Marianna Vardinoyannis, wife of Vardis Vardinogiannis

Greek-language surnames
Surnames